Conningbrook Lakes Country Park is a   nature reserve in Kennington, Ashford in Kent. It is managed by Kent Wildlife Trust.

There are three lakes in these former gravel pits, and other habitats are ponds, a river, grassland and wet woodland. In the winter there are migratory wildfowl and wetland birds such as  wigeon, tufted duck and gadwall.

There is access from Willesborough Road.

References

Kent Wildlife Trust